Kevin Barry Sullivan (9 September 1922 – 24 January 1972) was an Australian rules footballer who played with Collingwood in the Victorian Football League (VFL).

Notes

External links 

Profile from Collingwood Forever

1972 deaths
1922 births
Australian rules footballers from Melbourne
Collingwood Football Club players